

Events 
 Robert Plot misinterprets a piece of Megalosaurus thigh bone as belonging to a war elephant brought to Britain when the region was under the control of the Roman Empire. Despite recognizing this find as a petrified bone, he would later make the curious claim that fossils were made by God to decorate the inside of the Earth, and were thus never part of real animals.

References 

17th century in paleontology
Paleontology